Ernapadu is located in Bandiatmakur Mandal, Kurnool District, Andhra Pradesh, India with a population of approximately 8,000 people.

References 

Villages in Kurnool district